Kobelt may refer to:

People
 Georg Ludwig Kobelt (1804-1857), German anatomist
 Karl Kobelt (1891-1968), Swiss politician
 Wilhelm Kobelt (1840-1916), German zoologist

Other
 Kobelt Airport, an airport in Ulster County, New York, United States